William Paul Byers (born 1943) is a Canadian mathematician and philosopher; professor emeritus in mathematics and statistics at Concordia University in Montreal, Quebec, Canada.

He completed a BSc ('64), and an MSc ('65) from McGill University, and obtained his PhD ('69) from the University of California, Berkeley. His dissertation, Anosov Flows, was supervised by Stephen Smale.

His area of interests include dynamical systems and the philosophy of mathematics.

Books
Byers is the author of three books on mathematics:
How Mathematicians Think: Using Ambiguity, Contradiction, and Paradox to Create Mathematics (Princeton University Press, 2007)
The Blind Spot: Science and the Crisis of Uncertainty (Princeton University Press, 2011)
Deep Thinking: What Mathematics Can Teach Us About the Mind (World Scientific, 2015)

See also
 List of people from Montreal

References

External links

 

Canadian philosophers
Philosophers of mathematics
Canadian non-fiction writers
Living people
Academic staff of Concordia University
20th-century Canadian philosophers
University of California, Berkeley alumni
Writers from Montreal
1943 births